The Watson Family is the title of a recording by American folk music artist Doc Watson and The Watson Family, originally released in 1963.

The Watson Family is taken from field recordings by Ralph Rinzler, Eugene W. Earle, Archie Green, and Peter Siegel, done from 1960 to 1963. It was re-released on Smithsonian Folkways on CD in 1990 with additional tracks from the 1970s.

Reception

Writing for Allmusic, music critic Brian Whitener wrote the album "This Smithsonian Folkways release captures not only Doc Watson, but almost a dozen family members at the height of their power and has been deservingly hailed as a classic recording... A fabulous record that's a must-listen for any serious fan of American music."

Track listing
All songs Traditional unless otherwise noted.
 "Ground Hog" – 2:21
 "Every Day Dirt" – 2:08
 "Bonaparte's Retreat" – 1:31
 "The House Carpenter" – 4:33
 "I'm Troubled" – 2:42
 "Your Long Journey" (Rosa Lee Watson, A.L. Watson) – 2:36
 "When I Die" – 2:17
 "That Train That Carried My Girl From Town" – 2:20
 "Down the Road" – 1:41
 "The Lone Pilgrim" – 3:08
 "Texas Gales/Blackberry Rag" – 1:58
 "Darling Corey" – 2:37
 "The Triplett Tragedy" (Ed Miller) – 5:31
 "Muddy Roads" – 1:24
 "The Lost Soul" – 3:01
CD re-issue additional tracks:
 "Keep in the Middle of the Road" – 1:14
 "The Old Man Below" – 1:35
 "Pretty Saro" – 1:42
 "Cousin Sally Brown" – 2:20
 "Look Down That Lonesome Road" – 2:06
 "Doodle Bug" – 1:02
 "Rambling Hobo" – 1:38
 "The Cuckoo" – 3:03
 "Frosty Morn" – 1:41
 "Shady Grove" – 2:17
 "Southbound" (Merle Watson, Ryerson) – 2:40

Personnel
Doc Watson – guitar, banjo, harmonica, mandolin, autoharp, vocals
Merle Watson – guitar, banjo
Gaither Carlton – banjo, fiddle, vocals
Dolly Greer – vocals
Sophronie Miller Greer – vocals
Annie Watson – vocals
Arnold Watson – banjo, harmonica, vocals
Rosa Lee Watson –  vocals
Willard Watson – banjo
Ralph Rinzler – guitar
Production notes
Eugene Earle – engineer
David Glasser – digital editing
Archie Green – engineer
Mickey Hart – technical advisor
Suzanne Holder – assistant
Jeff Place – producer, liner notes
Ralph Rinzler – producer, engineer, executive producer
Mike Seeger – assistant
Peter Siegel – engineer
Lorrie Taylor – assistant
Bob Yellin – photography, cover photo

References

External links
The Watson Family discography

1990 live albums
Doc Watson live albums